This is a list of active power stations in South Australia, Australia. Candidates for this list must already be commissioned and capable of generating 1 MW or more of electricity.

Coal fired

Since 2016, there has been no coal-fired power generation in South Australia. The following fossil fuel power stations previously burned coal to power steam turbines that generate some or all of the electricity they produce.

Playford A ceased generating in 1985. Playford B ceased operation permanently in October 2015, having been out of operation since 2012. Northern ceased operation permanently in May 2016.

Gas turbine

These gas turbine power stations use gas combustion to generate some or all of the electricity they produce.

Two "temporary generation" facilities were introduced by the South Australian government before the 2017-18 summer season using General Electric gas turbine generators. They were intended to be used only in extreme circumstances to support the grid following two widespread blackouts in 2016. They were installed at the sites of the former Holden factory in Elizabeth South and the Adelaide Desalination Plant at Lonsdale. In 2022, the former Temporary Generation North turbines were successfully recommissioned at a new location as the Snapper Point Power Station at Outer Harbor.

Gas (thermal)

These power stations use gas combustion to power steam turbines that generate some or all of the electricity they produce.

Reciprocating engines

These power stations use reciprocating engines to generate some or all of the electricity they produce.

Hydroelectric

These hydroelectric power stations use the flow of water to generate some or all of the electricity they produce.

Wind farms

Solar

Battery Storage

See also
List of power stations in Australia
Electricity Trust of South Australia
Wind power in South Australia

References

External links
NEMMCO List of Generators (zip)
Government of South Australia Annual Report of the Technical Regulator 2004-05 (pdf)
List of Green Power approved generators (pdf)
Australian Business Council for Sustainable Energy
Map of Power Station Locations in the NEM
Hornsdale Power Reserve

 
power stations
South Australia
Power stations